The Czech National Bank issues 200 / 500 Koruna (Kč) silver commemorative coins and golden commemorative coins of various denominations. The golden coins are issued in thematic sets – Bohemian crown set, Charles IV set, Ten centuries of architecture set, Industrial Heritage Sites set and Bridges in the Czech Republic set. In 1999 the special 2000 Kč silver coin with golden inlay and hologram was issued. In 2019, to commemorate the 100th anniversary of Czechoslovak koruna, a heavyweight gold coin weighing 130 kg was issued as well as a commemorative one-hundred crown banknote.

Specifications 

Silver 200 Kc face value coins. (Issued from 1993 to 2010)

 diameter: 31 mm, thickness: about 2.3 mm, weight: 13 g
 purity: 900/1000 Ag 100/1000 Cu
 border proof : imprint "ČESKÁ NÁRODNÍ BANKA * Ag 0.900 * 13 g *"

Silver 200 Kc face value coins. (Issued from 2011)

 diameter: 31 mm, thickness: about 2.3 mm, weight: 13 g
 purity: 925/1000 Ag 75/1000 Cu
 border proof : imprint "ČESKÁ NÁRODNÍ BANKA * Ag 0.925 * 13 g *"

Silver 500 Kc face value coins. (Issued from 2011)

 diameter: 40 mm, thickness: about 2.6 mm, weight: 25 g
 purity: 925/1000 Ag 75/1000 Cu
 border proof : imprint "ČESKÁ NÁRODNÍ BANKA * Ag 0.925 * 25 g *"

Gold 1 000 Kc face value

 diameter: 16 mm, weight: 3,111 g
 purity: 999,9/1000 Au

Gold 2 000 Kc face value, Ten centuries of architecture

 diameter: 20 mm, weight: 6,22 g
 purity: 999,9/1000 Au

Gold 2 500 Kc face value, Industrial Heritage Sites

 diameter: 22 mm, weight: 7,777 g, thickness: 1,45 mm
 purity: 999,9/1000 Au

Gold 5 000 Kc face value

 diameter: 28 mm, weight: 15,55 g
 purity: 999,9/1000 Au

Gold 10 000 Kc face value

 diameter: 34 mm, weight: 31,107 g
 purity: 999,9/1000 Au

Most are made in PROOF and BU versions.

The Czech gold commemorative coin sets

All proof coins have got plain edge and all BU have got milled edge.

Castles in the Czech Republic 
Ten gold coins issued from 2016 to 2020. All have the face value of 5 000 Kč.

Bridges in the Czech Republic
Issued from 2011 from to 2015. All have got face value 5 000 Kc.

Industrial Heritage Sites
Issued from 2006 to 2010. All have got face value 2 500 Kc.

Ten centuries of architecture
Issued from 2001 to 2005. All have got face value 2 000 Kc.

Note: BČM = Bižuterie Česká Mincovna, a.s, Jablonec nad Nisou.

Charles IV set
Emission dates were 18.3.1998 and 24.2.1999. Mintage was 6000 for each emission.

Note: BČM = Bižuterie Česká Mincovna, a.s, Jablonec nad Nisou.

Bohemian crown set
Emission dates was 4.10.1995, 27.3.1996 and 2.4.1997.

Note: BČM = Bižuterie Česká Mincovna, a.s, Jablonec nad Nisou.

Special editions

Heavyweight gold coin 
Commemorative banknotes

The Czech silver 200 Kc commemorative coins

1993 - 2009 

 1st anniversary of the adoption of the Constitution of the Czech Republic – 1993
 650th anniversary of the foundation of the Prague Archbishopric and laying of the cornerstone of St.Vitus Cathedral – 1994
 50th anniversary of the Allied Landings in Normandy – 1994
 125th anniversary of the horse-drawn tram in Brno – 1994
 Protection of the environment – 1994
 Czech introduction to the euro – 2001
 150th anniversary birth of Mikoláš Aleš – 2002
 Jaroslav Vrchlický – 2003
 Skiers Union centennial – 2003
 150th anniversary birth of Leoš Janáček – 2004
 250th anniversary Lightning Conductor – 2004
 Czech EU accession – 2004
 425th anniversary of the Kralická Bible – 2004
 100 years of automobile – 2005
 Birth of Jan Werich/Jiří Voskovec – 2005
 Foundation of Unity of the Brethren (Unitas Fratrum) – 2007
 Entry into the Schengen Area – 2008
 100. Death of Josef Hlávka – 2008
 650. Foundation of vineyards by Charles the IV. – 2008
 150. Birth of Viktor Ponrepo – 2008
 100. Founding of National technical Museum – 2008
 Czech presidency of European Union – 2009
 World championship in classical ski – 2009
 100 years of reaching the North pole – 2009
 400 years from death of Rabí Jehuda Löw – 2009
 400 years from formulation of first two Keppler's laws – 2009

2010 - current

The Czech silver 500 Kc commemorative coins

The other Czech commemorative coins
Note: BČM = Bižuterie Česká Mincovna, a.s, Jablonec nad Nisou

See also 

 Commemorative coins of Czechoslovakia

References

External links 
 Numismatics department of the Czech National Bank (list of all Czech commemorative coins in English available)

Currencies of the Czech Republic
Czech Republic
Czech Republic-related lists